Valérie Ducognon (born 1972) from Granier near Beaufort, Savoie, is a French ski mountaineer.

Selected results 
 1999:
 1st, La Belle étoile race (together with Delphine Oggeri)
 1st, La Tournette race (together with Delpine Oggeri)
 2nd, European Championship team race (together with Delpine Oggeri)
 3rd, European Cup race "Miage Contamines Somfy" (together with Delpine Oggeri)
 2000:
 1st, French Championship team race (together with Delpine Oggeri)
 1st, La Tournette race (together with Delpine Oggeri)
 1st, Miage Contamines Somfy race (together with Delpine Oggeri)
 1st, L'Ubayenne race (together with Delpine Oggeri)
 1st, European Cup race "Vacheressane" (together with Delpine Oggeri)
 1st, European Cup race in Bivio (together with Delpine Oggeri)
 2nd, European Cup race in Bormio (together with Delpine Oggeri)
 2nd, European Cup total team ranking (together with Delpine Oggeri)
 3rd, French national ranking
 2001:
 1st, French Championship team race (together with Delpine Oggeri)
 2nd, European Championship team race (together with Delpine Oggeri)
 2nd, European Cup total team ranking (together with Delpine Oggeri)
 2nd, French national ranking
 2002:
 1st, World Championship single race
 1st, World Championship team race (together with Delpine Oggeri)
 1st, World Championship combination ranking
 1st, Trophée des Gastlosen (together with Delpine Oggeri)
 2003:
 2nd, European Championship team race (together with Delpine Oggeri)
 3rd, European Championship single race
 3rd, European Championship combination ranking
 2004:
 4th, World Championship team race (together with Delpine Oggeri)
 2005:
 1st, Pyramide d’Oz (together with Delpine Oggeri)

Pierra Menta 

 1999: 5th, together with Delphine Oggeri
 2000: 2nd, together with Delphine Oggeri
 2001: 2nd, together with Delphine Oggeri
 2002: 1st, together with Delphine Oggeri
 2003: 1st, together with Delphine Oggeri
 2005: 2nd, together with Delphine Oggeri
 2008: 5th, together with Delphine Oggeri

References 

1972 births
Living people
French female ski mountaineers
World ski mountaineering champions
21st-century French women